Upper Township is a large township in Cape May County, in the U.S. state of New Jersey. It is part of the Ocean City metropolitan statistical area. As of the 2020 United States census, the township's population was 12,539, an increase of 166 (+1.3%) from the 2010 census count of 12,373, which in turn reflected an increase of 258 (+2.1%) from the 12,115 counted in the 2000 census.

New Jersey Monthly magazine ranked Upper Township as its 2nd best place to live in its 2008 rankings of the "Best Places To Live" in New Jersey.

Upper Township is home to the only yellow fire trucks in Cape May County, a tradition started in 1985 when the Seaville Fire Rescue Company was purchasing a new vehicle and thought that federal regulations would require the color. Since being formed in 1964 and purchasing its first fire truck a year later, the Seaville company has served the area, responding to over 200 calls a year from its fire station is located on Route 50 across from Dino's Seaville Diner.

History 
Upper Township was formed as a precinct on April 2, 1723, and was incorporated as one of New Jersey's initial 104 townships by an act of the New Jersey Legislature on February 21, 1798. Portions of the township have been taken to form Dennis Township (March 1, 1827) and Ocean City borough (March 3, 1884), and territorial changes were made involving Sea Isle City in March and April 1905. The township's name came from its location when Cape May was split into three townships in 1723 at the same time that Lower Township and Middle Township were created.

During 2008, Upper Township was considering consolidation with neighboring Corbin City. Corbin City already shares extensively with Upper Township for municipal service, but the question of consolidating municipalities across county borders presented an obstacle to a full merger.

Geography
According to the United States Census Bureau, the township had a total area of 68.68 square miles (177.89 km2), including 62.03 square miles (160.65 km2) of land and 6.66 square miles (17.24 km2) of water (9.69%).

Strathmere (2010 population of 158) is an unincorporated community and census-designated place (CDP) located within Upper Township.

Other unincorporated communities, localities and place names located partially or completely within the township include Beesley's Point, Blackmans Island, Cedar Springs, Corsons Inlet, Formosa, Greenfield, Marmora, Marshallville, Middletown, Miramar, Palermo, Petersburg, Seaville, Steelmantown, Tuckahoe, West Ocean City and Whale Beach.  The township contains many different communities and enclaves that create a diverse area reaching from Great Egg Harbor to the Atlantic Ocean. Seaville is the largest community and Strathmere is the township's island containing a beach community.

The township borders the municipalities of Dennis Township, Ocean City, Sea Isle City and Woodbine in Cape May County; Corbin City, Egg Harbor Township, Estell Manor and Somers Point in Atlantic County; and Maurice River Township in Cumberland County.

Demographics

2010 census

The Census Bureau's 2006-2010 American Community Survey showed that (in 2010 inflation-adjusted dollars) median household income was $81,250 (with a margin of error of +/− $8,629) and the median family income was $97,372 (+/− $6,832). Males had a median income of $63,597 (+/− $2,442) versus $46,250 (+/− $4,552) for females. The per capita income for the borough was $38,702 (+/− $2,243). About 2.5% of families and 4.0% of the population were below the poverty line, including 2.9% of those under age 18 and 6.6% of those age 65 or over.

2000 census
As of the 2000 United States census there were 12,115 people, 4,266 households, and 3,365 families residing in the township. The racial makeup of the township was 97.59% White, 0.69% African American, 0.12% Native American, 0.61% Asian, 0.06% Pacific Islander, 0.19% from other races, and 0.74% from two or more races. Hispanic or Latino of any race were 1.28% of the population.

There were 4,266 households, out of which 39.5% had children under the age of 18 living with them, 67.7% were married couples living together, 8.5% had a female householder with no husband present, and 21.1% were non-families. 17.4% of all households were made up of individuals, and 8.3% had someone living alone who was 65 years of age or older. The average household size was 2.84 and the average family size was 3.23.

In the township the population was spread out, with 28.6% under the age of 18, 6.0% from 18 to 24, 27.7% from 25 to 44, 25.5% from 45 to 64, and 12.2% who were 65 years of age or older. The median age was 38 years. For every 100 females, there were 93.0 males. For every 100 females age 18 and over, there were 89.4 males.

The median income for a household in the township was $60,942, and the median income for a family was $68,824. Males had a median income of $46,528 versus $31,325 for females. The per capita income for the township was $27,498. About 2.4% of families and 3.5% of the population were below the poverty line, including 3.1% of those under age 18 and 3.8% of those age 65 or over.

Parks and recreation
With its beaches in the Strathmere section, Upper Township is one of five municipalities in the state that offer free public access to oceanfront beaches monitored by lifeguards, joining Atlantic City, North Wildwood, Wildwood and Wildwood Crest.

Government

Local government
Upper Township is governed under the Township form of New Jersey municipal government, one of 141 municipalities (of the 564) statewide that use this form, the second-most commonly used form of government in the state. The Township Committee is comprised of five members, who are elected directly by the voters at-large in partisan elections to serve three-year terms of office on a staggered basis, with either one or two seats coming up for election each year as part of the November general election in a three-year cycle. At an annual reorganization meeting, the Township Committee selects one of its members to serve as Mayor.

, members of the Upper Township Committee are Mayor John C. "Jay" Newman (R, term on committee ends December 31, 2024; term as mayor ends 2023), Deputy Mayor Kimberly R. Hayes (R, term on committee ends 2024; term as deputy mayor ends 2023), Curtis T. Corson Jr. (R, 2023), Victor W. Nappen II (R, 2025) and Mark E. Pancoast (R, 2025).

After Hobie Young resigned from office from a seat expiring in December 2022, Kim Hayes was appointed to fill the vacancy. In the November 2021 general election, Hayes ran for a full three-year term, while Mark Pancoast ran for the balance of Young's term of office, with both winning their election bids.

Federal, state and county representation 
Upper Township is located in the 2nd Congressional District and is part of New Jersey's 1st state legislative district.

Politics
As of March 2011, there were a total of 9,154 registered voters in Upper Township, of which 1,403 (15.3%) were registered as Democrats, 4,454 (48.7%) were registered as Republicans and 3,287 (35.9%) were registered as Unaffiliated. There were 10 voters registered as Libertarians or Greens.

In the 2012 presidential election, Republican Mitt Romney received 58.2% of the vote (4,027 cast), ahead of Democrat Barack Obama with 40.5% (2,807 votes), and other candidates with 1.3% (89 votes), among the 6,998 ballots cast by the township's 9,487 registered voters (75 ballots were spoiled), for a turnout of 73.8%. In the 2008 presidential election, Republican John McCain received 57.2% of the vote (4,165 cast), ahead of Democrat Barack Obama, who received 40.9% (2,980 votes), with 7,286 ballots cast among the township's 9,053 registered voters, for a turnout of 80.5%. In the 2004 presidential election, Republican George W. Bush received 61.1% of the vote (4,391 ballots cast), outpolling Democrat John Kerry, who received around 37.6% (2,701 votes), with 7,192 ballots cast among the township's 8,988 registered voters, for a turnout percentage of 80.0.

In the 2013 gubernatorial election, Republican Chris Christie received 70.2% of the vote (3,396 cast), ahead of Democrat Barbara Buono with 28.2% (1,364 votes), and other candidates with 1.6% (77 votes), among the 4,974 ballots cast by the township's 9,433 registered voters (137 ballots were spoiled), for a turnout of 52.7%. In the 2009 gubernatorial election, Republican Chris Christie received 57.8% of the vote (2,865 ballots cast), ahead of both Democrat Jon Corzine with 33.4% (1,655 votes) and Independent Chris Daggett with 6.3% (312 votes), with 4,954 ballots cast among the township's 9,341 registered voters, yielding a 53.0% turnout.

Education

The Upper Township School District serves students in pre-kindergarten through eighth grade. As of the 2021–22 school year, the district, comprised of three schools, had an enrollment of 1,404 students and 122.0 classroom teachers (on an FTE basis), for a student–teacher ratio of 11.5:1. Schools in the district (with 2021–22 enrollment data from the National Center for Education Statistics) are 
Upper Township Primary School with 497 students in grades PreK-2, 
Upper Township Elementary School with 408 students in grades 3-5 and 
Upper Township Middle School with 485 students in grades 6-8. Students from Corbin City, a non-operating school district, attend the Upper Township schools as part of a sending/receiving relationship.

Students in public school for ninth through twelfth grades from Upper Township attend Ocean City High School in Ocean City as part of a sending/receiving relationship with the Ocean City School District, along with students from Corbin City, Longport and Sea Isle City. As of the 2021–22 school year, the high school had an enrollment of 1,231 students and 126.4 classroom teachers (on an FTE basis), for a student–teacher ratio of 9.7:1.  about 60% of students in Ocean City High School were from Upper Township.

Countywide schools include Cape May County Technical High School (for technical school students) and Cape May County Special Services School District (for special needs students) in Cape May Court House.

The Roman Catholic Diocese of Camden operates Bishop McHugh Regional School, a Catholic K-8 school, in Dennis Township, which has a Cape May Courthouse postal address. The Press of Atlantic City describes it as being in Ocean View, though it lies outside of the Ocean View CDP. It is the parish school of Marmora/Woodbine Catholic Church and three other churches.

Cape May County Library operates the Upper Township Branch in Petersburg.

Police Department
Upper Township does not maintain its own municipal police department. The township is served by the New Jersey State Police who respond from their barracks in neighboring Woodbine.

Transportation

Roads and highways

The Garden State Parkway passes through and has two exits that provide access to Route 50 and U.S. Route 9 (since the Beesley's Point Bridge is closed). The Parkway connects Dennis Township on the south to Egg Harbor Township in the north. at Interchange 20 for Seaville / Tuckahoe and Interchange 25 for Ocean City / Marmora via County Route 623.

Other major roads that pass through include Route 49, CR 548 and CR 557.

Public transportation
NJ Transit offers the 313 and 315 (and the 316 offering seasonal service) inter-city bus routes that runs through the town three times a day and shuttle people between Cape May and Philadelphia, the 319 route between Cape May and the Port Authority Bus Terminal in Midtown Manhattan, and the 552 route between Cape May and Atlantic City.

Points of interest
Tuckahoe station
Marshallville Historic District
Thomas Beesley Sr. House
John Wesley Gandy House

Notable people

People who were born in, residents of, or otherwise closely associated with Upper Township include:
 George Gandy (1851–1946), business executive and developer, best known for constructing the original Gandy Bridge, the first bridge to span the Tampa Bay in Florida.
 Garet Garrett (1878–1954), journalist and author, noted for his opposition to the New Deal and U.S. involvement in World War II.
 Carlton Godfrey (1865–1929), politician and businessman who served in the New Jersey General Assembly for five years and was Speaker of the House in 1915.
 Ford Palmer (born 1990), professional middle-distance runner who specializes in the 1500 meters and the mile.
 Bob Pellegrini (1934–2008), linebacker who played in the National Football League for the Philadelphia Eagles and the Washington Redskins.
 Dummy Stephenson (1869–1924), outfielder in Major League Baseball who played for the Philadelphia Phillies in 1892.
 Adam Williamson (born 1984), professional soccer midfielder who has played for the Ocean City Barons in the USL Premier Development League.

References

External links

Upper Township website
Upper Township School District

School Data for the Upper Township School District, National Center for Education Statistics
The Upper Township Gazette Local community newspaper

 
1723 establishments in New Jersey
Jersey Shore communities in Cape May County
Populated places established in 1723
Township form of New Jersey government
Townships in Cape May County, New Jersey